Wesburn is a town in Victoria, Australia, 62 km east from Melbourne's central business district, located within the Shire of Yarra Ranges local government area.

Predominantly rural in nature, the township has a narrow ribbon of residential dwellings along and branching off the Warburton Highway.

The name Wesburn is derived from its original name of West Warburton. Warburton West Post Office opened on 7 February 1893, was renamed Wesburn in 1925 and closed in 1993. Wesburn was also served by a railway station on the former Warburton railway line until closure in 1965. Today the former railway line has been transformed into a walking and cycling path called the Warburton Trail.

Wesburn Primary School opened in 1904 after relocation of the building from Millgrove. The school has a current enrolment of around 100 and is a participant in the Stephanie Alexander Kitchen Garden program.

The Wesburn Recreation Reserve hosts junior football and netball teams. The township is also serviced by a pub and a number of small shops. Public transport is provided by bus route from Warburton to Chirnside Park.

References

External links

Towns in Victoria (Australia)
Yarra Valley
Yarra Ranges